Paolo Mascagni (25 January 1755 – 19 October 1815) was an Italian physician and anatomist. He is most well known for publishing the first complete description of the lymphatic system.

Biography

Early life 
Mascagni was born in the comune of Pomarance (in the Province of Pisa) to Aurelio Mascagni and Elisabetta Burroni, both belonging to old gentry families of Chiusdino (in the Province of Siena). He studied philosophy and medicine at the University of Siena. Upon graduating in 1777, renowned anatomist Pietro Tabarrani took Mascagni as an assistant. Upon Tabarrani's death in 1780, Mascagni was appointed as an anatomy lecturer at the University of Siena.

Career 

As a young man, Mascagni was interested in geological sciences, as evidenced by his several papers on the Lagoni (thermal springs) of Siena and Volterra. Upon graduation, he turned his interest to the human lymphatic system. His many discoveries in this field led to the composition and publication of Vasorum lymphaticorum corporis humani historia et iconographia in 1787. He was elected a corresponding member of the Royal Swedish Academy of Sciences in 1796, and president of the Accademia dei Fisiocritici in 1798.

During the French occupation of Tuscany in the spring of 1799, Mascagni showed himself to be an enthusiastic Jacobin. For this reason, he spent seven months in prison after the French were expelled. Mascagni was freed from prison by a motu proprio of the King of Etruria, who on 22 October 1801 appointed Mascagni a professor of anatomy at the University of Pisa, with the additional charge of lecturing twice a week at the Hospital of Santa Maria Nuova in Florence.

In 1807, Mascagni was appointed professor of anatomy at the University of Florence. There, he wrote Treatise of Anatomy.

Collaborations 
In 1781, Mascagni began advising sculptor Clemente Susini, who was working on a collection of human anatomical waxes. The collection was completed in 1786 and consisted of approximately 800 pieces.

In 1801, the Sardinian anatomist Francesco Antonio Boi became a student of Mascagni. Mascagni and Boi entered into a close collaboration as well as a personal friendship. The anatomical waxes are held in the Museo archeologico nazionale in Cagliari.

Death 
Mascagni died of sepsis in 1815. Some decades after his death, his statue was erected in the courtyard of the Uffizi.

Legacy
Mascagni posthumously published two works:
 Prodromo della grande anatomia (1821)
 Anatomicae universae iconae (1823)

Mascagni has been posthumously credited with the first discovery of meningeal lymphatic vessels, though his findings were disregarded during his lifetime. These vessels were conclusively discovered in mice in 2014 and subsequently confirmed in humans and non-human primates in 2017.

See also

 François Carlo Antommarchi

Notes

References

1755 births
1815 deaths
People from Pomarance
Italian anatomists
18th-century Italian physicians
Members of the Royal Swedish Academy of Sciences
Academic staff of the University of Pisa